Werner Eschauer (born 26 April 1974) is an Austrian former professional tennis player.

Tennis career
In his first 12 years as a pro, Eschauer found little success, winning just 7 ATP-level matches and cracking the top-100 for just a few weeks in late 2003, peaking at No. 96.

In 2007 however, at the age of 33, Eschauer cracked the top 100 in April and reached World No. 52 in August. He won 7 ATP-level matches in 2007 to match his total from the previous 12 years and won 4 matches at the Dutch Open in July to reach his first ATP final, including a win over Carlos Moyà in the quarters. He then lost to Steve Darcis, another first-time finalist.

Eschauer's most notable match likely was playing Rafael Nadal on Centre Court at Wimbledon in the 2nd round in June 2007. ESPN's Chris Fowler reported during coverage of this event that when searching for a left-handed player to practice against as a warm-up for the left-handed Nadal, Eschauer ended up facing off against John McEnroe. Fowler described Eschauer as coming from a modest background, and stated that he did not receive support from the Tennis Federation.

ATP career finals

Singles: 1 (1 runner-up)

Doubles: 1 (1 runner-up)

ATP Challenger and ITF Futures finals

Singles: 23 (13–10)

Doubles: 17 (6–11)

Performance timeline

Singles

External links 
 
 
 
 Eschauer World Ranking History

Austrian male tennis players
People from Amstetten District
1974 births
Living people
Sportspeople from Lower Austria